Congress Rental Network (CRN) is a worldwide network of technology meeting specialists. As an organization, it aims to provide technical solutions, in regards to conference, congress and audiovisual requirements for meetings and events. It is linked to conference equipment manufactured by German conglomerate Bosch.

History
CRN was created in 1990 with the first members to joining in, under the guidance of Philips (at that time - now Bosch), were located in Denmark, the Netherlands and Italy. It has been associated with G20's meetings and with the International Association of Conference Interpreters (AIIC).

References

External links
 CRN official website

Business services companies established in 1990
Dutch companies established in 1990
Event management companies